The 2008 MLS season was the second season in Toronto FC's existence. The club's season began on March 29, 2008 in an away game against Columbus Crew, which resulted in a 2–0 loss. The club's first goal of the season was scored by Maurice Edu on April 5, 2008 in a 4–1 loss against D.C. United.

Club

Management

Other information

Squad
As of October 26, 2008.

First team

List of 2008 transfers

In

Out

Players out on loan

Squad statistics
Competitive matches only. Numbers in brackets indicate number of games started.
Updated to games played October 26, 2008.

Players

Goalkeepers

1Player is no longer with team
2Left club at start of the season but later rejoined under a new contract
GA = Goals against; GAA = Goals against average; CS = Clean sheets

Competitions summary
Updated to games played October 26, 2008.

Pre-season friendlies

Regular season

Results summary

Results by round

Canadian Championship

Matches
Updated to games played October 26, 2008.

Legend

Pre-season

Friendly matches

2008 Texas Pro Soccer Festival

2008 Carolina Challenge Cup

Mid-season friendly matches

2008 Major League Soccer season

Canadian Championship

Player seasonal records
Competitive matches only. Updated to games played October 26, 2008.

Top goalscorers

Goals conceded

Discipline

Club seasonal records
Updated to games played October 26, 2008.

Matches
Season record wins
 Record win: 2–0 (v. Kansas City Wizards, April 26, 2008)
 Record away win: 3–1 (v. New York Red Bull, October 4, 2008)

Season record defeats
 Record defeat: 4–1 (v. D.C. United, April 5, 2008)
 Record home defeat: 3–1 (v. Chivas USA, September 6, 2008)

Season record draws
 Highest scoring home draw: 1–1 (v. New York Red Bulls, May 1, 2008)
 Highest scoring away draw: 2–2 (v. FC Dallas, October 11, 2008)

Sequences
Most consecutive wins: 3 (April 13, 2008 – May 1, 2008)
Most consecutive draws: 2 (May 1, 2008 – May 17, 2008)
Most consecutive losses: 2 (March 29, 2008 – April 13, 2008)
Most consecutive matches unbeaten: 6 (April 13, 2008 – May 24, 2008)
Most consecutive matches winless: 7 (August 17, 2008 – October 4, 2008)

Attendance
Highest home attendance: 20, 461 (v. New England Revolution, August 23, 2008)
Lowest home attendance: 19, 657 (v. Columbus Crew, September 13, 2008)
Average league attendance: 20,241

References

Toronto FC seasons
Tor
Tor